Joseph Taborsak (born January 23, 1975) is an American politician who served in the Connecticut House of Representatives from the 109th district from 2007 to 2013.

References

1975 births
Living people
Politicians from Danbury, Connecticut
Democratic Party members of the Connecticut House of Representatives
21st-century American politicians